KB8 may stand for:

 Kobe Bryant (1978–2020), former professional basketball player
 Kidz Bop 8, an album by Kidz Bop